AEBSF or 4-(2-aminoethyl)benzenesulfonyl fluoride hydrochloride is a water-soluble, irreversible serine protease inhibitor with a molecular weight of 239.5 Da. It inhibits proteases like chymotrypsin, kallikrein, plasmin, thrombin, and trypsin. The specificity is similar to the inhibitor PMSF, nevertheless AEBSF is more stable at low pH values. Typical usage is 0.1 - 1.0 mM.

Mechanism of action 
Both AEBSF and PMSF are sulfonyl fluorides and are sulfonylating agents. Sulfonyl fluorides act by reacting with the hydroxy group of the active site  serine residue to form a sulfonyl enzyme derivative. This derivative may be stable for long periods of time except at high pH.

Use in cholesterol regulation studies 

AEBSF is extensively used in studies aiming to describe cholesterol regulatory genes due to its potent ability to inhibit Site-1-protease (S1P). This serine protease, located in the Golgi apparatus, is responsible for activating the sterol regulatory element-binding proteins (SREBP). By selectively inhibiting S1P, AEBSF can be used to characterize the downstream result of SREBP inhibition and its influence on cholesterol regulation.

See also

 PMSF

References

External links
 The MEROPS online database for peptidases and their inhibitors: AEBSF
 A Link to the ABRF group usegroup archive with an informative discussion of covalent modifications to proteins resulting from use of AEBSF: 

Serine protease inhibitors
Phenethylamines
Sulfonyl halides